TELUS Spark Science Centre is a science museum with interactive exhibits, multimedia presentations and educational demonstrations in Calgary, Alberta, Canada.  There are more than 430,000 visitors annually, including over 82,000 students.

The science museum was established in 1987 as the Calgary Science Centre. The science centre was later re-branded Telus World of Science – Calgary in 2005. In 2011, the science centre moved locations from the former Centennial Planetarium to the Nose Creek Valley. The science centre was re-branded as Telus Spark during the move.

History 

The science centre originally opened as the Calgary Centennial Planetarium on July 1, 1967. In 1983 the Calgary Science Centre Society began a bid to bring a science centre to Calgary and in 1987 they received an operating agreement that would transform the planetarium into the Calgary Science Centre.

The Calgary Science Centre was renamed Telus World of Science – Calgary after a $9 Million donation from Telus Corporation on April 27, 2005.

The original site, located on 11 Street SW in Calgary's Downtown West End, closed on June 27, 2011, and was replaced by a new science centre called Telus Spark. The new science centre is located on a  site at 220 St. Georges Drive NE in Nose Creek Valley, north of the Calgary Zoo. Telus Spark opened on October 29, 2011.

COVID-19 crisis 
In response to the COVID-19 pandemic, Telus Spark was awarded $381,414 by the Government of Canada to promote uptake of COVID-19 vaccines among indigenous youth, communities and leaders using online education and hip hop music.

Galleries

Telus Spark offers a range of digital media and maker workshops, school programs, youth programs, sleepovers, birthday parties, and various spring and summer science and art camps.

Being Human 
The Being Human space explores human physiology.

Creative Kids Museum 
Designed for children under the age of nine, the Creative Kids Museum has a water play area, a climbing structure, a maker space, a miniature theatre, a reading nook, and a stimulating crawling track designed for toddlers.

Earth & Sky 

Earth & Sky explores geology, meteorology and astronomy.

Energy & Innovation 
Energy & Innovation explores the energy industry and the effects it has on society. This exhibit houses three rolling ball machines built by George Rhoads.

Feature Gallery 
The Feature Gallery hosts temporary touring exhibitions, and can be rented for tradeshows and other private functions.

HD Digital Dome Theatre  
The HD Digital Dome Theatre can show films or live planetarium shows, using an Evans & Sutherland Digistar 5 computer graphics system with 17.7 million pixels of resolution, 4 SRX projectors, and a 19,500 watt sound system. There is also a digital media studio where visitors can learn computer graphics techniques, from computer programming and coding to intensive animation workshops.

Open Studio 
The Open Studio shows youths how to use technology in art.

See also
 Telus World of Science (disambiguation)

References

External links
 

Science museums in Canada
Museums in Calgary
2011 establishments in Alberta
Museums established in 2011
Science centers